Electric Ireland is an Irish utility company that supplies electricity and gas to business and residential customers in Ireland. It is the supply division of the Electricity Supply Board, the former monopoly electricity company in Ireland. The company now operates in an open market competing for the supply of retail electricity to residential customers. Electric Ireland sells a variety of smart technology, including Electric Vehicle Home Chargers, solar PV panels, battery storage, which are also sold by Electric Ireland's online shop. Other major suppliers include Airtricity and, more recently, Bord Gáis Energy.

The business was known previously as ESB Customer Supply and ESB Independent Energy before 4 April 2011. The brand was a transitional one; in January 2012, all references to ESB were dropped and it is simply known as Electric Ireland.

Regulation and pricing
As a part of the regulatory system, the company as the former monopoly must sell its electricity at a premium of 10% above market price in order to encourage new entrants to the market place. The company has been unable to compete with these new entrants. It has been announced that ESB Customer Supply must re-brand the entire supply operation and lose 40 per cent of its customers before it will be allowed to decide its own prices. Currently it is regulated by the Commission for Energy Regulation.

Low carbon economy
In April 2010, the company's renewable energy investment fund, ESB Novusmodus, joined the Climate Change Capital Private Equity Fund to pledge €5 million to support Cork-based company Nualight. Nualight are considered as part of the low-carbon economy due to their long lasting LEDs which are used in supermarkets in Ireland, the UK, Germany and Switzerland.

Partnerships and acquisitions
In May 2010, ESB announced a partnership with GT energy, to create Ireland's first geothermal electricity project.

In June 2010, ESB announced the acquisition of a wind farm project in South Wales which currently generates 34.5 MW.

Sponsorship 
Electric Ireland has a number of sponsorship programmes including Darkness Into Light, with Pieta House, The GAA Minor Championships and The GAA Higher Education Championships.

References

External links
Electric Ireland

Electric power companies of the Republic of Ireland